The Guangzhou International Documentary Film Festival is a state-endorsed documentary film festival held in the city of Guangzhou, China. It is one of the biggest documentary film festivals in China.

See also 
 List of film festivals in China

References

External links 

Documentary film festivals in China
Culture in Guangzhou